Raul Cano is a microbiologist and medical mycologist, Professor Emeritus at the biology department at California Polytechnic State University, San Luis Obispo, California. His claim to fame is having revived microorganisms from amber alongside entomologist George Poinar Jr. This received widespread attention when author Michael Crichton adapted the process for the book and movie Jurassic Park. Initially, a company was founded to promote medical uses of the microorganisms, which proved unsuccessful. 

In 2008 he co-founded Fossil Fuels Brewing Company. Cano claims that their beer is brewed with "ancient yeast" that he extracted from amber and revived after 25 million to 45 million years. The process used to extract the yeast is similar to the process described in the book Jurassic Park that was used to retrieve dinosaur blood from mosquitos trapped in amber. The beer has received mixed reviews, with critics noting that it has a unique taste.

References

External links
Biography

California Polytechnic State University faculty
Living people
Year of birth missing (living people)